Sassafras is an unincorporated community in Kent County, Maryland, United States. The Lanthim House, built in the 1720s, served as a general store.

Nearby Rich Hill was listed on the National Register of Historic Places in 1972.

Education
It is in the Kent County Public Schools. Kent County Middle School is in Chestertown, and Kent County High School is in an unincorporated area, in the Butlertown CDP with a Worton postal address.

The community was formerly assigned to Millington Elementary School. In 2017 the school board voted to close Millington Elementary School.

References

External links 

Photos of Sassafras and Rich Hill
Map of Sassafras, from the Historical Society of Kent County collection

Unincorporated communities in Maryland
Unincorporated communities in Kent County, Maryland